Richard White Bernard Ellis FRSE OBE MID (25 August 1902 – 15 September 1966) was a British paediatrician. He was made President of the British Paediatric Association in 1965.

Early life
He was born on 25 August 1902 the son of Bernard Ellis, a prominent Quaker in Leicester. He studied at Downs and Leighton Park School: then a Quaker school. In 1920 he joined his elder brother at King's College, Cambridge. He graduated with an MA in natural sciences in 1923 then went to St Thomas Hospital in London for professional training as a doctor, receiving an MB from the University of London in 1926.

Career
He worked at Great Ormond Street Hospital and under Kenneth Blackfan at the Boston Children's Hospital.

In 1936, he was appointed Physician for  children's diseases at Guy's Hospital in London. During this period he campaigned to obtain part of the £200,000 endowment left by Caleb Diplock to "the children of Sussex" and succeeded in gaining 10% of this sum for Guy's. The two children's wards were updated using this money and thereafter were known as Caleb Ward and Diplock Ward.

In 1937 he travelled to Spain to aid Basque refugees in the Spanish Civil War. He was a member of the National Joint Committee for Spanish Relief from 1937-39. During this period he adopted two Spanish children.

In the Second World War he initially involved himself in the plight of Polish refugees in Romania and Hungary. From 1940 he served in the Royal Air Force Medical Service, with the rank of Wing Commander (but is not thought to have had any pilot training). He served in North Africa, Italy and Belgium. For his role as Medical Adviser to the Mediterranean Allied Air Force he was awarded the Order of the British Empire (OBE) in 1945. He continued to travel after the war, giving educational programmes on child-health in Africa, India and Indonesia.

In 1946, he became Professor of Childlife and Health at the University of Edinburgh retiring there in 1964.

In 1952, he was elected a Fellow of the Royal Society of Edinburgh.

In 1960, he became Chairman of the Remand Homes Committee.

From 1958, was diagnosed with cancer and had a carcinoma removed. He died at the Glebe House, Hawridge, Berkhamsted on 15 September 1966.

Family
In 1941, he married Dr Audrey Russell, who also worked in the relief effort during the Spanish Civil War. They adopted two Spanish children, rescued from the Spanish Civil War.

Publications
Child Health and Development (1949)
Diseases of Infancy and Childhood (1951)
Health in Childhood (1961)

References

1902 births
1966 deaths
British paediatricians
Fellows of the Royal Society of Edinburgh
Alumni of the University of Cambridge
British people of the Spanish Civil War
Deaths from cancer in England
People from Leicester
Military personnel from Leicester
Royal Air Force officers
Royal Air Force personnel of World War II